General Abdullahi Ahmed Jama Ilkajir is a Somali politician, who was Puntland's Interior Minister from January 2009 to February 2014. He is the former Minister of Education of Somalia, having been appointed to the position on 12 January 2015 by the former Prime Minister Omar Abdirashid Ali Sharmarke. However, he only served  2 weeks when on 17 January 2015, Prime Minister Sharmarke dissolved his newly nominated cabinet due to vehement opposition by legislators, who rejected the reappointment of certain former ministers.

On 27 January 2015, Sharmarke appointed a new, smaller 20 minister cabinet of which Abdullahi Ahmed Jama was replaced by Khadra Bashir Ali. On 6 February, Sharmarke finalized his cabinet, consisting of 26 ministers, 14 state ministers, and 26 deputy ministers of which Abdullahi Ahmed Jama was reinstated but was now the Minister of Justice. He has now been succeeded by Hassan Hussein Hajji.

2 August 2022, newly prime minister Hamza Abdi Barre appointed his cabinets which includes by Abdullahi Ahmed Jama (ilka jiir) as Ministry of Ports (Somalia).

Biography

Jama was born on March 13, 1951, in Erigavo, a town in northern Somalia. He completed his primary education at Dayaha, a boarding school near Erigavo. Upon graduating, he was accepted into the newly established the National Teachers’ Education Center (NTEC) at the outskirts of Mogadishu, known as Lafole. Jama joined the Somali National Army and attended the Military Academy in Odessa (Ukraine), earning his first degree in military science in 1973. At first he was nicknamed Ilkajir, an it was later adopted as a surname. Markus Hoehne, page 163</ref>

From 1980 to 1983, he attended the Staff College in Cairo, Egypt earning a master's degree in military science. In 1988-89, he also attended the US Army War College in Carlisle, Pennsylvania and earned a diploma in strategy and decision-making. In 2000, Jama attended Bryan & Stratton College at Rochester, NY and earned a degree in Accounting.

As a career military officer and leader, Jama held many positions in the Somali National Army: from Battalion Commander to Army Commander. He was by far the youngest Officer to head the Directorate of Operations of the Somali National Army.

Jama is a veteran of the 1977 Ogaden war, where he received two bronze medals and one silver medal for bravery as well as numerous certificates of merit for outstanding conduct.

Puntland
In August 2008, Ilka jiir promised of running in and winning the upcoming Puntland region's presidential election. Ilkajir received a huge welcome throughout Badhan District.

After having lost the Puntland macro-region's 2009 presidential race to Abdirahman Mohamud Farole, Ilkajir was appointed by Farole to the position of Interior Minister in Puntland's cabinet in what was widely seen as a welcome attempt to settle political differences.

Ilka jiir's new role as Puntland's Interior Minister includes duties such as forming local district/regional governors across Puntland, areas which now also include the former Maakhir.

References

1951 births
Living people
Puntland politicians
Government ministers of Somalia